Earle's balanced salt solution is an isotonic saline solution (or balanced salt solution) formulated by W.R. Earle in 1943. It contains sodium chloride, potassium chloride, calcium chloride, magnesium sulfate, sodium dihydrogen phosphate, sodium bicarbonate and dextrose (glucose). It is intended to be used in 5% CO2 atmosphere. It is a base of many cell culture media.

References 

Cell culture media